A female queen, diva queen, or hyper queen is a drag queen who identifies as a woman. These performers are generally indistinguishable from the more common male drag queens in artistic style and techniques.

Other terms still used both by performers and in the media are considered offensive. The term "faux queen" is rejected and considered outdated by many drag artists for implying that female drag queens are not as "real" as cisgender male drag queens,  and the terms "bio queen" and "female queen" are considered by many performers to be transphobic as they imply that a transgender woman who performs as a drag queen is not female. Other descriptions include "biologically challenged" drag queen, "female female impersonator", or "female impersonator impersonator." All of these terms are generally considered acceptable only when used by the performer themselves, and many drag queens reject all terms that define them by their sex.

Concept

Like all drag performers, female drag queens play with traditional gender roles and gender norms to educate and entertain. AFAB (assigned female at birth) queens can appear alongside drag kings or drag queens at drag shows and are interchangeable with other drag queens as emcees, performers, hostesses, and spokesmodels.

For some it can be a way to redefine postmodern feminism; AFAB queen Ms. Lucia Love stated, "Drag queens would be nowhere without women." For others it simply is about dressing up and having fun.

In San Francisco, the first ever "Faux Queen" pageant was produced as a benefit for the drag performer Diet Popstitute the first title-holder was Coca Dietetica aka Laurie Bushman. The Klubstitute Kollective was formed after Diet Popstitute's 1995 death to continue to raise funds and provide a space for the performers who, at the time, were not always welcome in typical drag venues. Pageant organizer Ruby Toosday had "friends who got fired (from drag clubs) for being women...it seemed like we had definitely hit a nerve. Contestants were judged on drag, talent, and personality by a panel of judges and the winner helped "femcee" the following year. The pageants were held from 1996 to 2005. The Faux Queen Pageant was resurrected in 2012 by former title holder Bea Dazzler, and will continue to be a yearly competition in San Francisco.

The dancer and performance artist Fauxnique (Monique Jenkinson) became the first cisgender female drag queen to win a major drag pageant—competing against cis male or trans female drag queens—when she was crowned Miss Trannyshack 2003. From Bust Magazine: "'(drag) comes down to a sort of self-awareness, a self-consciousness about playing around with femininity,' says Fauxnique. She adds that while drag for her is primarily about performance, it's also a 'rejection of traditional oppressive forms of masculinity—and that's part of an affinity with gay men as well. I wouldn't say every faux queen is a feminist, but I would say that a part of them is in some way.'"

In the 1970s and 1980s, German-born Brazilian cisgender female queen Elke Maravilha became a popular TV personality after participating as a judge in the Chacrinha and Silvio Santos talent shows. According to her, "many people think I am a transvestite. When they ask me this, I jokingly reply that I'm a man indeed. And of the most gifted ones".

The comedy films Connie and Carla and Victor/Victoria both center on cisgender female drag queens, but the main characters of both films are women who are forced by circumstance to work as drag queens. They keep their gender a secret and impersonate men when off-stage, unlike their real-life counterparts.

The 2020 US reality TV vogue competition Legendary was the first US reality television show to include cisgender women performing and competing as drag queens, including the all-female team representing House of Ninja. The reality competition Dragula featured two AFAB performers in their third season, but winner Landon Cider performs as a drag king and contestant Hollow Eve identifies as a non-binary drag artist, not specifically a drag queen. AFAB drag queen Sigourney Beaver competed in season 4, being one of the four finalists.  In 2021, the third season of RuPaul's Drag Race UK was the first season in the franchise to feature a queen who was both assigned female at birth and identified as female, Victoria Scone.

Controversy 
Female drag queens are not always permitted or welcomed within drag spaces, which are typically owned and run by cisgender gay men. RuPaul, the producer and host of the reality TV competition RuPaul's Drag Race, has banned female artists from his shows, stating "Drag loses its sense of danger and its sense of irony once it’s not men doing it, because at its core it’s a social statement and a big f-you to male-dominated culture. So for men to do it, it’s really punk rock, because it’s a real rejection of masculinity." After significant backlash, RuPaul amended this response in 2019 to state “I’ve learnt to never say never.” 

There are widely-held beliefs within the community that female drag queens do not face the same challenges as cisgender male drag queens, and do not need to use padding, makeup, or tucking to appear feminine. AFAB artists typically counter that they use the same makeup techniques to create exaggerated femininity, and many do use padding and corsets to create an extreme body shape. Female queens on Instagram often mock this belief that they do not "transform" their bodies by sharing strikingly different images of themselves in and out of drag with the hashtag #wheresthetransformationsis, started by AFAB queen Creme Fatale.

The rejection of female drag queens is often closely linked to other reports of discrimination and objectification that women, transgender men, and nonbinary people assigned female at birth face within LGBT spaces. These artists frequently report groping and harassment from cisgender gay men in gay bars and performance spaces, and report less pay and less tips from audiences. Artists also have complained about drag terminology that they state is exclusionary or offensive; AFAB artist Hollow Eve sparked a significant debate in 2019 when an episode of Dragula aired where they spoke out against the term "fishy," used to mean a drag queen who looks like a cisgender woman and referring negatively to the smell of a vulva.

The rising prominence of AFAB drag queens and increased dialogue around inclusivity has resulted in many drag artists rejecting any distinction based on their gender and calling for drag competitions to remove all gender and biological sex requirements for contestants.

Gallery

See also 

 Gender bender
 Genderqueer
 Queer
 Trannyshack
 "Werking Mom"

References

External links 

 Example of an FTM "Faux Queen" Persona How to Work It - TranÀpus Rex

Drag (clothing)
Culture of San Francisco
LGBT terminology
Women performance artists
Drag performers